The Monti Iblei Cup (in italian Coppa Monti Iblei) is a car competition, more precisely a hillclimbing, which takes place annually in Chiaramonte Gulfi (Sicily).

The event 

The race is disputed as tradition, on the hairpin bends of Mount Arcibessi. In recent years the path on Hyblaean Mountains has been slightly lengthened, this extension made the race recognized as a valid race for the Trofeo italiano velocità montagna-sud, Sicilian hill speed championship and Sicilian hill speed championship for historic cars. also allowing a better and easier use, to those who can arrive from Ragusa, from Modica, from Vittoria from the nearby mountain Municipalities such as Monterosso Almo and Giarratana, but also from other Hyblean areas, in addition to allowing a greater tourist flow.

In Piazza Duomo, to Chiaramonte Gulfi, it is possible to taste typical Sicilian dishes by the local associations that adhere to the initiative (Association Contrada Muti, Association Contrada Piano dell’Acqua and Youth Association of Roccazzo).

Points of the race course 
Departure from Bar Pentagono, Villaggio Gulfi shopping center, curve of the oil mill, curve of the four chapels, ring road, curve of the forest barracks, Sanctuary of the Madonna delle Grazie and on arrival) and in the city center (Balcony of Sicily, Corso Umberto and Piazza Duomo).

Absolute winners (recent) 

The following table shows the winners of the event:

 2004	Giovanni Cassibba		Osella BMW
 2005	Giovanni Cassibba		Osella BMW	
 2006	Carmelo Scaramozzino		Breda Racing/ BMW	
 2007	Luigi Bruccoleri		Osella PA21/S	
 2008	Rocco Aiuto		        Osella PA20/S	
 2009	Salvatore Tavano		Tatuus Master	
 2010	Salvatore Tavano		Tatuus Master	
 2011	Luigi Bruccoleri		Osella PA27	
 2012	Domenico Scola jr.		Osella PA21/S	
 2014	Domenico Cubeda		        Osella PA2000	
 2015	Domenico Cubeda		        Osella PA2000	
 2016	Domenico Cubeda		        Osella PA2000	
 2017	Domenico Cubeda		        Osella FA30	Zytek
 2018	Domenico Cubeda		        Osella FA30 Zytek
 2019	Domenico Cubeda		        Osella FA30 Zytek

Bibliography 
 "50 anni e non li dimostra", edition: Elle Due, on behalf of Automobile Club d'Italia of Ragusa (2007).

See also 
 Catania-Etna (Hill Climb)
 Giarre-Montesalice-Milo (Hill Climb)
 Nissena Cup (Hill Climb)

References 

Hillclimbs
Auto races in Italy
Motorsport venues in Italy
Province of Ragusa